School of Philosophy may also refer to:
The discipline of Philosophy
School of Economic Science and Philosophy by Leon MacLaren
School (discipline), a group of people with shared styles, approaches or aims, e.g. a school of painting, or a school of thought
Scholasticism, a method of learning taught by the academics of medieval universities circa 1100–1500